Nakht was an ancient Egyptian official who held the position of a scribe and astronomer of Amun, probably during the reign of Thutmose IV of the Eighteenth Dynasty. He was buried in the Theban Necropolis in tomb TT52.

See also
 List of ancient Egyptian scribes
 List of Theban Tombs

References

External links

Ancient Egyptian priests
Ancient Egyptian scribes
Thutmose IV